Labelling or labeling is describing someone or something in a word or short phrase.

Labeling may also refer to:
 Packaging and labeling
 Food labelling
 Labeling theory, in sociology
 Isotopic labeling
 Typography (cartography), also known as map labeling, placing text on maps
 Automatic label placement, the computational algorithms for automating map labeling

See also
Label (disambiguation)
Label printer